Moka's Fabulous Adventures! is a French animated children's television series created by Andres Fernandez and Maxance Sani. The series was animated by Xilam Animation with the participation of Gulli.

Voice cast

English dub
 Barbara Scaff as Moka and Cherri

French dub
 Dorothée Pousséo as Moka
 Olivia Luccioni as Cerise/Cherri

Episodes

Season 1 (2019 - 2021)

References

External links 

 

2019 French television series debuts
2010s animated television series
French children's animated comedy television series
French flash animated television series
French-language television shows